Mohd. Rafiqul Alam Beg (born 7 January 1959) is a Bangladeshi professor of mechanical engineering and academic administrator. He served as the vice chancellor of Rajshahi University of Engineering & Technology (RUET). He was appointed to a four-year term on 28 May 2014.

Biography
Beg completed his B.Sc. Engineering at University of Rajshahi (RU) in 1979. He returned to RU in 1984 as a lecturer, and would continue to teach there as the four engineering colleges under RU were combined into Bangladesh Institute of Technology (BIT) in 1986 and then renamed RUET in 2003. Meanwhile, he earned a M.Sc.Eng. from Bangladesh University of Engineering and Technology  (BUET) in 1987, and a Ph.D. from Jadavpur University in Kolkata in 1997. His research focus is on internal combustion engines, including the combustion behavior and pollution control of, and use of alternative fuels in, ceramic coated diesel engines.

At what is now RUET, Beg served four terms as the head of the Department of Mechanical Engineering, and was the dean of the Faculty of Mechanical Engineering from 2008 to 2010. He was appointed to a four-year term as vice chancellor on May 28, 2014.

For nearly a day, starting on 4 February 2017, Beg and 15 other teachers were confined by students who had since 28 January been boycotting classes in protest against the imposition of the "33 credit system". The system required that students complete a minimum of 33 credits in order to avoid repeating the year. Prior to the introduction of the system, students who completed fewer credits could still continue to the next session, and could catch up on credits later. Beg was freed and students agreed to return to classes after the academic council voted to revoke the "33 credit system". The same afternoon, however, the RUET Teachers Association called a strike protesting the students' conduct towards the teachers. They remained on strike for nearly two weeks.

References

1959 births
Living people
Academic staff of the University of Rajshahi
University of Rajshahi alumni
Bangladesh University of Engineering and Technology alumni
Jadavpur University alumni
Place of birth missing (living people)